Zsolt Czingler (born 28 April 1971 in Budapest) is a retired Hungarian triple jumper, whose personal best was 17.24 metres, achieved in May 1998 in Tivoli.

Achievements

References

External links
 
 

1971 births
Living people
Hungarian male triple jumpers
Athletes (track and field) at the 1996 Summer Olympics
Athletes (track and field) at the 2000 Summer Olympics
Olympic athletes of Hungary
Athletes from Budapest